Thomas Von Essen  (born 1945 in Brooklyn, New York) was appointed the 29th FDNY Commissioner of the City of New York by Mayor Rudolph W. Giuliani on April 15, 1996 and served in that position until the end of the Rudolph Giuliani Administration on December 31, 2001, nearly four months after the September 11, 2001 attacks.

Biography 
Von Essen is a member of the Von Essen family, who are part of the German and Swedish nobility. He is a graduate of St. Francis College, class of '72. 

In 2002 he was made an Honorary Commander of the Order of the British Empire (CBE) by Queen Elizabeth II.

In 1993 Von Essen was elected as President of the Uniformed Firefighters Association representing the department's firefighters. He was formerly a Senior Vice-President at Giuliani Partners and Chief Executive Officer of Giuliani-Von Essen LLC. 

Von Essen was the Commissioner for the New York City Fire Department when the September 11th, 2001 terrorist attacks on the World Trade Center took place. He personally went to the Twin Towers to oversee evacuations by his department following the arrival of the first units there with 1st Battalion Chief Joseph W. Pfeifer and the companies with him, who were investigating a report of a smell of gas only a few blocks away when American Airlines Flight 11, piloted by Mohamed Atta, crashed into the North Tower, followed 17 minutes later by United Airlines Flight 175, piloted by Marwan al-Shehhi, slamming into the South Tower. Von Essen and his men evacuated as many people as they could until the South Tower collapsed 56 minutes after it was hit, at which point Chief Pfeifer ordered all personnel to evacuate the North Tower before it collapsed. Von Essen escaped the collapse of the Twin Towers, and continued to serve as FDNY Commissioner until Mayor Rudy Giuliani's term ended in December 2001. He was succeeded by Nicholas Scoppetta as FDNY Commissioner under new NYC Mayor Michael Bloomberg.

In October 2017 Von Essen was named FEMA Regional Administrator for Region II in New York City by President Donald Trump.

Personal life
He and his wife, Rita, have four children; the youngest is actor and singer, and Tony nominee Max von Essen.

References

External links
 NYC govt. website

1945 births 
Living people
Commissioners of the New York City Fire Department
Survivors of the September 11 attacks
People from Brooklyn
Date of birth missing (living people)
St. Francis College alumni
Commanders of the Order of the British Empire
German nobility
Swedish nobility
Essen family